Half Mile Home is an American gospel music trio from Akron, Ohio, where they blend Christian R&B and Christian hip hop together to make their version of urban contemporary gospel. They started making music in 2004, with their first studio album, The Movement. Their second studio album, Change My Lyfe, was released in 2010, while the third studio album, Church Muzik & Inspiration, was released in 2013. "Church Muzik & Inspiration"  stayed on the Gospel Billboard sales charts for 34 weeks & peeked @ the # 10 spot... The fourth Cd "Don't Judge Me" to be released spring 2016 has a top 10 single "More Than Enuff" which has been on the Billboard magazine charts 28 weeks.

Background
Half Mile Home are two brothers from Akron, Ohio, where they were established in 2004, being vocalist and guitarist, Terrence Burton lead vocalist and drummer, Todd Burton vocalist, pianist and producer, Darryl Brownlee lead vocalist and guitarist.

Music history
The trio started as a Gospel musical entity in 2003, with their first studio album, The Movement in 2004, that was released on September 21, 2004, by Malaco/Marxan Records. Their subsequent studio album, Change My Lyfe, was released on April 13, 2010, from Bungalo Records/God Made Millionairze Inc. They released, Church Muzik & Inspiration, on January 22, 2013, with Church Boy Muzik/ Selecto Hits. This album was their breakthrough release upon the Billboard magazine charts, where it peaked at No. 9 on the Top Gospel Albums chart.

Members
 Dave Felder – Lead Vocals, Song Writer & Drummer
 Todd Burton – Vocals, Piano/Keyboards/Organ, Producer
 Darryl Brownlee – Lead Vocals, Guitarist

Discography

References

External links
https://halfmilehome.online/

American gospel musical groups
Musical groups from Ohio
2004 establishments in Ohio
Musical groups established in 2004